Epeiroides is a genus of orb-weaver spiders containing the single species, Epeiroides bahiensis. It was first described by Eugen von Keyserling in 1885, and has only been found in Costa Rica and Brazil.

References

Araneidae
Monotypic Araneomorphae genera
Spiders of Central America
Spiders of South America
Taxa named by Eugen von Keyserling